Richard Dell'Agnola (born 6 February 1949 in Rabat, Morocco) is a member of the National Assembly of France.  He represents the Val-de-Marne department,  and is a member of the Union for a Popular Movement.

References

1949 births
Living people
People from Rabat
French people of Italian descent
Rally for the Republic politicians
Union for a Popular Movement politicians
Deputies of the 12th National Assembly of the French Fifth Republic
Deputies of the 13th National Assembly of the French Fifth Republic
Mayors of places in Île-de-France
The Republicans (France) politicians